Aemocia is a genus of longhorn beetles of the subfamily Lamiinae, containing the following species:

 Aemocia balteata Pascoe, 1865
 Aemocia borneana Breuning, 1974
 Aemocia farinosa Pascoe, 1865
 Aemocia griseomarmorata Breuning, 1970
 Aemocia ichthyosomoides Thomson, 1864

References

Mesosini
Cerambycidae genera